Nino Habun (born 30 May 1979) is a Croatian sprinter. He competed in the men's 4 × 400 metres relay at the 2000 Summer Olympics.

References

External links
 

1979 births
Living people
Athletes (track and field) at the 2000 Summer Olympics
Croatian male sprinters
Olympic athletes of Croatia
Place of birth missing (living people)